{{Infobox military unit
| unit_name = 100th Training Division
| image = 100th Infantry Division SSI.svg | image_size = 150px
| caption = 100th Training Division shoulder sleeve insignia
| dates = 1918–19191921–19461946–present
| country = 
| allegiance = 
| branch = 
| type = Training
| role = 
| size = Division
| command_structure = United States Army Reserve Command
| current_commander = 
| garrison = Fort Knox, Kentucky, U.S.
| ceremonial_chief = 
| nickname = CenturySons of Bitche
| motto = "Success in Battle""Soldiers of the Century""Train 'em Tough!"
| colors = Blue and red
| march = 
| mascot = 
| battles = World War I
World War II
 Rhineland
 Ardennes-Alsace
 Central Europe
| notable_commanders = Withers BurressAndrew Tychsen
| anniversaries = 
| identification_symbol = 
| identification_symbol_label = Distinctive unit insignia
}}

The 100th Training Division (Leader Development) (formerly the 100th Infantry Division) is a division of the United States Army headquartered at Fort Knox, Kentucky. It currently serves as a major training command of the United States Army Reserve. It has been known as the "Century Division"'' owing to its "100th" designation.

Throughout its long history, the division has taken on numerous roles. Serving as the 100th Infantry Division until the 1950s, the division then briefly became the 100th Airborne Division before becoming the 100th Division (Training). Since this transformation, the division has primarily taken on numerous training roles for other Army units.

It was originally activated in mid-1918, too late to join the fighting in World War I. The division is best known for its exploits during World War II as the 100th Infantry Division. Fighting in the European Theater, the division advanced through France and Germany through the end of the war, fending off heavy German counterattacks along the way. World War II would be the only war the division would see active combat in before taking on its role as a training unit.

History

World War I

The 100th Division was constituted on 12 July 1918 in the National Army. It was organized in October of that year at Camp Bowie, Texas. It was assigned the 199th Infantry Brigade commanding the 397th Infantry Regiment, the 398th Infantry Regiment and the 200th Infantry Brigade, commanding the 399th Infantry Regiment and the 400th Infantry Regiment. Each brigade commanded around 8,000 soldiers.

The division then began preparations to deploy to Europe and join the American Expeditionary Force in combating the Central Powers. Before the division could deploy, though, World War I ended on 11 November 1918, Armistice Day. The 100th Division then began demobilizing as part of the post-war drawdown of the U.S. Army. It would remain on the U.S. Army's rolls until 26 July 1919, when the last units demobilized at Camp Zachary Taylor, Kentucky.

Interwar period

Only two years later, on 24 June 1921, the division was reconstituted in the Organized Reserve, allotted to the Fifth Corps Area, and assigned to the XV Corps. The states of West Virginia and Kentucky were allotted as the division's home area, with its headquarters organized in Wheeling, West Virginia, on 27 September 1921. On 29 May 1923, the division received its shoulder sleeve insignia.

Most of the division's assigned Reserve officers were Reserve Officers' Training Corps graduates from West Virginia University, the University of Kentucky, or Western Kentucky State Teachers' College. As with most other Reserve divisions, the 100th saw little service in major maneuvers in the interwar period because of shortages of personnel and equipment, only conducting routine training and administering the Citizens' Military Training Camps in its home area. The headquarters location was changed in 1924 to Huntington, West Virginia and was changed again in 1937 to Charleston, West Virginia.

World War II

Mobilization

On 23 February 1942, the 199th and 200th Infantry Brigade headquarters were disbanded, and the division was placed in command of the 397th, 398th, and 399th Infantry Regiments directly; the 400th Infantry Regiment was inactivated by relief of Reserve personnel. The 100th Infantry Division was ordered into active military service on 15 November 1942 at Fort Jackson, South Carolina. The enlisted and officer cadre came from the 76th Infantry Division.  The commander of the 100th was Major General Withers A. Burress, one of only eleven generals who commanded their divisions from mobilization until the end of the war.

From late 1943 to early 1944, the division trained in the mountains of Tennessee and was subsequently sent to Fort Bragg, North Carolina, for further training. While at Fort Bragg, Technical Sergeant Walter L. Bull earned the first Expert Infantryman's Badge.

Order of battle

 Headquarters, 100th Infantry Division
 397th Infantry Regiment
 398th Infantry Regiment
 399th Infantry Regiment
 Headquarters and Headquarters Battery, 100th Infantry Division Artillery
 373rd Field Artillery Battalion (155 mm)
 374th Field Artillery Battalion (105 mm)
 375th Field Artillery Battalion (105 mm)
 925th Field Artillery Battalion (105 mm)
 325th Engineer Combat Battalion
 325th Medical Battalion
 100th Cavalry Reconnaissance Troop (Mechanized)
 Headquarters, Special Troops, 100th Infantry Division
 Headquarters Company, 100th Infantry Division
 800th Ordnance Light Maintenance Company
 100th Quartermaster Company
 100th Signal Company
 Military Police Platoon
 Band
 100th Counterintelligence Corps Detachment

The division sailed to Europe on 6 October of that year. The division arrived at Marseille, France, on 20 October. It was made part of VI Corps of the Seventh United States Army, Sixth United States Army Group.

European Theater

As soon as the division was prepared for combat, it began moving into the Meurthe-et-Moselle region, and sent its first elements into combat at St. Remy in the Vosges Mountains on 1 November 1944. The division as a whole began the relief of the 45th Infantry Division at Baccarat on 5 November, and assumed control of the sector on 9 November. The attack jumped off on 12 November, and the division drove against the German Winter Line in the Vosges Mountains. The 100th took Bertrichamps and Clairupt, pierced the German line, and seized Raon-l'Étape and Saint-Blaise-Moyenmoutier between 16 and 26 November. Later in November the division moved into the Vosges region, elements assisted in holding the Saverne Gap bridgehead while the bulk of the division went into reserve. The unit was relieved from assignment to VI Corps and transferred to the US XV Corps on 27 November 1944. It then moved into the Moselle region.

In December 1944, the division went on the offensive in the vicinity of Bitche, France. The division occupied the nearby areas of Wingen and Lemberg after fierce fighting on 6–10 December. The division then advanced to Reyersviller, which fell after fighting on 11–13 December. On 14 December, regiments from the 100th started their assault on a minor fortification Freundenburg and Fort Schiesseck, a major defensive work in the region. Fort Freundenburg was captured on 17 December by the 100th division's 398th Infantry Regiment. Fort Schiesseck capitulated after three more days of heavy assault by the 100th on 20 December. The division was ordered to halt its attack and to hold defensive positions south of Bitche as part of the Seventh Army during the Battle of the Bulge. Thanks to a stout defense, the men of the 100th later became known as the "Sons of Bitche". The German counterattacks of 1 and 8–10 January 1945 were repulsed, after heavy fighting at Bitche. After further attacks stalled and the Germans began to withdraw, the sector was generally quiet and the division prepared to resume its offensive east.

On 15 March 1945, the attack jumped off and on 16 March, Bitche fell to the 100th Infantry Division. The unit was then relieved from assignment to XV Corps, and transferred to XXI Corps on 22 March 1945. Taking Neustadt and Ludwigshafen, the division reached the Rhine River on 24 March. On 25 March 1945, the unit was returned from XXI Corps back to VI Corps. On 31 March 1945, the 100th Infantry Division crossed the Rhine and moved south in the wake of the 10th Armored Division and then east across the Neckar River, establishing and enlarging a bridgehead from 4 to 11 April. Heilbronn fell after nine days of house-to-house combat on 12 April and the division resumed its rapid pursuit of the enemy, reaching Stuttgart by 21 April. The 100th was mopping up along the Neckar, southeast of Stuttgart on 23 April, when it was removed from VI Corps and assigned directly to the Seventh United States Army as an Echelon Above Corps Asset. The division was then assigned primarily to patrolling the sector east of Stuttgart. Shifting to Göppingen on 30 April, the Division engaged in occupational duties as the war in Europe came to an end on V-E Day. The division had spent 163 days in combat.

The division took 13,351 enemy prisoners of war on its own. Members of the division won three Medals of Honor, seven Distinguished Service Crosses, five Legions of Merit, 492 Silver Star Medals, 23 Soldier's Medals, 5,156 Bronze Star Medals, and 90 Air Medals. The division itself was awarded three campaign streamers for participation in the campaign.

100th Infantry Division returned to the United States via the Hampton Roads Port of Embarkation on 10 January 1946, and was released from active duty at Camp Patrick Henry, Virginia that day. The division then began the process of demobilization, before inactivating on 26 January.

Casualties
Total battle casualties: 5,038
Killed in action: 883
Wounded in action: 3,539
Missing in action: 483
Prisoner of war: 491

Post War

Cold War
In fall of 1946, the division was reactivated in the U.S. Army Reserve as the 100th Airborne Division in Louisville, Kentucky. This distinction as one of the few airborne divisions within the U.S. Army was brief; in 1952 the division was once again redesignated the 100th Infantry Division. It would change names again in 1955, this time to 100th Division (Replacement Training). It would once again be reorganized in 1959 to its present designation as 100th Division (Institutional Training). Its mission became to teach basic, advanced, and common training skills to soldiers from the Army's active, reserve, and National Guard components.

In 1961, some 1,500 soldiers from the 100th were activated and sent to Fort Chaffee, Arkansas, in order to provide support during the Berlin Crisis. During their time on active duty, the 100th successfully trained some 32,000 soldiers after thoroughly rebuilding and fixing the old Army base. The unit was returned to reserve status again in August 1962. In 1968, the division received its distinctive unit insignia, which alluded to its history in World War II and as a Kentucky-based unit.

With the Reorganization Objective Army Division plan in 1968, the division ceased to be centered on regiments and instead was reorganized with brigades. However, with the 199th Infantry Brigade active as a separate brigade, the division's new brigades were activated from units that had been under its command in World War II. The division's headquarters element (which had since been replaced by a Headquarters and Headquarters Company) was redesignated the 1st Brigade, 100th Division responsible for basic armor school training. The 928th Field Artillery Battalion became the 2nd Brigade, 100th Division responsible for armored cavalry unit training. The 325th Engineer Battalion became the 3rd Brigade, 100th Division responsible for combat support training, and the 800th Ordnance Battalion became the 4th Brigade, 100th Division, responsible for combat service support training.

In 1978, the 100th became the first Army Reserve formation to be equipped with its own squadrons of M1 Abrams tanks. With the arrival of the M3 Bradley infantry fighting vehicles, the division's mission profile changed from individual combat training to armor and armor reconnaissance training. By 1986, it was the largest reserve unit within the state of Kentucky, commanding fifty-eight percent of instate reservists.

Gulf War and beyond
At the outbreak of Operation Desert Storm in 1991, the 100th was assigned to armor training at Fort Knox, Kentucky for deploying armor units. Armor training was a responsibility that the division continued after the war.

In 1995 the division was reorganized to include Army Reserve schools, taking over the responsibilities for new programs. In 1996 the 100th Division's 1st Brigade worked with Readiness Group Knox to pioneer the national training experiment to reserve combat units at crew and platoon levels. Later that year, the division added three additional divisional brigades; the 5th Brigade, 100th Division in Memphis, Tennessee for health services training, the 6th Brigade, 100th Division in Louisville, Kentucky for professional development training, and the 7th Brigade, 100th Division at Fort Knox, formed from the 100th Training Command and responsible for training exercises. The 5th Brigade moved to Millington, Tennessee in 1997, and the 7th Brigade inactivated in 2000. The 8th Brigade, 100th Division was also activated as a unit overseeing ROTC training.

During 1997, the division was tasked with partial responsibility for Operation Future Challenge at Fort Knox, a six-week Reserve Officer's Training Corps Basic Camp during each summer. By 2000, the 100th has assumed full responsibility for running the camp. Later that same year, the 100th began inactivating many of its M1A1 Abrams tanks as part of a reduction in military expenditures.

After the September 11 attacks, the 100th Division began taking on the job of preparing Army National Guard units from Ohio and Kentucky as they began to prepare for deployment in support of the War on Terrorism.

By 2006, the division had moved its headquarters from Louisville to Fort Knox, easing distance strains in administration and training. In line with Army Reserve transformations, the 100th Division restructured, eliminating all but four of its brigades. The division shifted its focus from initial entry training to providing military occupational specialty and non-commissioned officer training for four army career fields across the United States. The 100th Division (Operational Support) teaches soldiers subjects from military intelligence, signal corps, civil affairs/psychological operations and health services.

On 1 October 2018 the 100th Training Division was redesignated as the 100th Training Division (Leader Development). The 100th Training Division (Leader Development) establishes and implements the Army Reserve Leader Development Strategy to provide a continuum of career education, training, and experience for leaders in the Army Reserve. During this reorganization, the 83rd USARRTC and the 97th (CGSOC) Brigade were placed under the 100th Training Division.

Subordinate units 

As of 2018 the following units are subordinated to the 100th Training Division (Leader Development):

 Headquarters and Headquarters Company, 100th Training Division, Ft Knox, KY
 83rd United States Army Reserve Readiness Training Command, Ft. Knox, KY
 Readiness Training Academy, Ft. Knox, KY
 NCO Academy – Parks, Parks Reserve Forces Training Area, Dublin, CA
 NCO Academy – McCoy, Fort McCoy, WI
 NCO Academy – ASA Fort Dix, Joint Base McGuire-Dix-Lakehurst, NJ
 97th Brigade (Command and General Staff Officer Course), Fort Sheridan, IL
 11th Battalion, 95th Regiment (CGSOC), Kansas City, MO
 10th Battalion, 80th Regiment (CGSOC), Owings Mills, MD
 11th Battalion, 108th Regiment (CGSOC), Concord, NC

Honors

Unit decorations
During the Second World War many units within the division were awarded Distinguished Unit Citations, as well as Meritorious Unit Citations.

Campaign streamers

Legacy
The division's legacy in World War II has been honored several times. The Cross Island Parkway in Queens, New York was renamed the "100th Infantry Division Parkway" in 2005 in honor of 2,300 soldiers from New York that served with the division during the war. Three soldiers earned the Medal of Honor serving with the division in World War II. They were Edward A. Silk, Mike Colalillo, and Charles F. Carey Jr.

References

Sources

External links
The Story of the Century: The Story of the 100th Infantry Division
The 100th Infantry Division Association 
GlobalSecurity: 100th Division
Memoirs archived at the George C. Marshall Foundation

100 Infantry Division
Infantry Division, U.S. 100
Military units and formations established in 1918
1918 establishments in Texas
United States Army divisions of World War I
Infantry divisions of the United States Army in World War II
History of Louisville, Kentucky
Training divisions of the United States Army